Jaime Yzaga was the defending champion, but lost in the first round this year.

MaliVai Washington won the title, defeating Claudio Mezzadri 6–3, 6–3 in the final.

Seeds
A champion seed is indicated in bold text while text in italics indicates the round in which that seed was eliminated.

  Aaron Krickstein (quarterfinals)
  David Wheaton (first round)
  Derrick Rostagno (second round)
  MaliVai Washington (champion)
  Jaime Yzaga (first round)
  Franco Davín (quarterfinals)
  Bryan Shelton (first round)
  Francisco Roig (second round)

Draw

External links
 Singles draw

Singles